The Union was a proposed $100 coin of the United States dollar.  It was canceled before any pattern coins could be minted.

History 
In 1854, San Francisco businessmen sent a petition to Secretary of the Treasury James Guthrie for a $50 coin to be struck due to the fact that no banknotes of any denomination circulated in California.  Guthrie responded to the petition by introducing a measure to produce gold $50 and $100 coins, called half union and union, respectively.  Although the measure passed the Senate on June 16, 1854, it was ultimately defeated in the House.

United States Mint engraver George T. Morgan made sketches of a possible design for a $100 coin in 1876, should the half union ever be a success.  When the mint concluded that the half union (a gold coin weighing about ) was infeasible, the idea of a union coin was discarded and forgotten.

Fantasy coins 
Around 2005, Morgan's original sketches were discovered and published so the numismatic community could see what could have been. Private mints have since struck fantasy pieces of Morgan's design for collectors, in both silver and gold.

Modern union coins 
The $100 denomination has been produced by the US Mint since 1997 in the form of the American Platinum Eagle bullion coin.  The bullion American Liberty union of 2015, 2019, and 2021 as well as the proof American Liberty 225th Anniversary union of 2017 were struck in 24 karat gold.

References 

United States gold coins
Goddess of Liberty on coins
Eagles on coins
Economic history of California
One-hundred-base-unit coins